The 1976 Grand Prix motorcycle racing season was the 28th F.I.M. Road Racing World Championship season.

Season summary
1976 marked the beginning of the era of Suzuki domination with the Japanese firm taking 11 of the first 12 places in the premier class. Angel Nieto would take his fifth world title in the 50cc division, this time aboard a Bultaco. In the 125cc class, it was more of the same with Morbidelli taking another crown with Pier Paolo Bianchi claiming the championship. Walter Villa would claim double world championships in the 250cc and 350cc classes for Harley-Davidson fighting off a strong challenge from defending champion, Johnny Cecotto in the larger class.

Barry Sheene came to the fore with a dominating championship season in the 500cc division, finishing ahead of his Suzuki teammate Teuvo Länsivuori. Newcomer Marco Lucchinelli impressed as well on a Suzuki but injuries curtailed his performance. Pat Hennen became the first American rider to win a 500cc Grand Prix, when he triumphed at the Finnish Grand Prix.

1976 marked the end of an era as it would be the last time the Isle of Man TT would appear on the Grand Prix calendar. Once the most prestigious race of the year, the event had been increasingly boycotted by the top riders. The TT finally succumbed to pressure for increased safety in racing events. The season also marked the end of another era with 15 time world champion Giacomo Agostini winning his last Grand Prix at the season-ending round at the Nürburgring. As Agostini had chosen the MV Agusta for this challenging track, this win was also the last for a 500cc four-stroke engine.

1976 Grand Prix season calendar

Participants

500cc participants

Notes

 * Länsivuori was disqualified for the second round of the season, the Austrian GP,  for not stopping his engine during a refuelling stop.

Final standings

500cc standings

350cc standings

250cc standings

125cc standings

50cc standings

See also
 1976 Formula 750 season

References

 Büla, Maurice & Schertenleib, Jean-Claude (2001). Continental Circus 1949-2000. Chronosports S.A. 

Grand Prix motorcycle racing seasons
Grand Prix motorcycle racing season